Belgium-Rwanda relations refers to the international and diplomatic relations between Belgium and Rwanda. Belgian relations with Rwanda started under the League of Nations mandate, when the modern day countries of Rwanda and Burundi were governed as Ruanda-Urundi. As the colonial power, Rwanda's relationship with Belgium has been significant throughout the country's history, even after independence.

History

Initial Contact 
Ruanda and Burundi were two independent kingdoms in the Great Lakes region before the Scramble for Africa. In 1894, they were annexed by the German Empire and eventually became two districts of German East Africa. As part of the Allied East African Campaign, Ruanda and Burundi were invaded by a Belgian force in 1916. The German forces in the region were small and hugely outnumbered. Ruanda was occupied over April–May and Burundi in June 1916.

Belgian Rule 

The Treaty of Versailles in the aftermath of World War I divided the German colonial empire among the Allied nations. German East Africa was partitioned, and Belgium was allocated to Ruanda-Urundi even though this represented only a fraction of the territories already occupied by the Belgian forces in East Africa. Later, the League of Nations officially awarded Ruanda-Urundi to Belgium as a B-Class Mandate on 20 July 1922. The mandatory regime was also controversial in Belgium and it was not approved by Belgium's parliament until 1924. Unlike colonies which belonged to its colonial power, a mandate was theoretically subject to international oversight through the League's Permanent Mandates Commission (PMC) in Geneva, Switzerland.

After a period of inertia, the Belgian administration became actively involved in Ruanda-Urundi between 1926 and 1931 under the governorship of Charles Voisin. The Belgians extended and consolidated a power structure based on indigenous institutions. In practice, they developed a Tutsi ruling class to formally control a mostly Hutu population, through the system of chiefs and sub-chiefs under the overall rule of the two Mwami. Contemporary racial science and eugenics led Belgian administrators believed that the Tutsi were genetically more closely related to Europeans than the Hutu superior and deserved power. Some scholars circulated, including John Hanning Speke, propagated the Hamitic hypothesis which held that the Tutsi were descended from "black Caucasians" who invaded Europe and were the ancestors of all the more "civilised" African peoples.

The League of Nations was formally dissolved in April 1946, following its failure to prevent World War II. It was succeeded, for practical purposes, by the new United Nations (UN). In December 1946, the new body voted to end the mandate over Ruanda-Urundi and replace it with the new status of "Trust Territory".

Independence 
Following anti-colonial independence movements throughout Africa, and unrest in Rwanda which included the overthrow of the monarchy in the Rwandan Revolution, Ruanda-Urundi became independent after a rushed transition on 1 July 1962. It was broken up on traditional lines, becoming the Republic of Rwanda and the Kingdom of Burundi.

Post-Independence 
The newly independent Republic of Rwanda, under its first President Greogire Kayibanda, immediately established formal diplomatic relationships with Belgium.

Genocide 
The Arusha Accords of 1993, the peace treaty which initially ended the Rwandan Civil War, led to the United Nations approving the mandate of UNAMIR as a peacekeeping force. Belgium and Bangladesh were the first nations to contribute troops. The Belgian contingent was made up of around 440 troops.

After the assassination of Juvénal Habyarimana on 6 April 1994, rumours that Belgian troops were responsible spread on Hutu Power propaganda radio, including the Radio Television Libre de Milles Collines. En route to protecting then-Prime Minister, Agathe Uwilingiyama, fifteen Belgian UNAMIR peacekeepers were taken prisoner by the Rwandan Army. 10 of them from the Paracommando Brigade were killed - hacked to death with machetes and dismembered. This was a strategic move by the Hutu Power extremists. As Human Rights Watch's Allison Des Forges points out, these murders were "the first step in the plan revealed in the January 11 cable for getting rid of an effective UNAMIR force".

On 12 April, the Belgian government announced that it was withdrawing its troops, and began lobbying for a complete withdrawal of UNAMIR.

Post-Genocide 
Belgium re-established diplomatic relations with Rwanda after the Genocide. It is one of Rwanda's largest donors of bilateral aid, donating $41.84 million in 2019.

Resident diplomatic missions
 Belgium has an embassy in Kigali.
 Rwanda has an embassy in Brussels.

Education
École Belge de Kigali is a Belgian international school in Kigali.

References 

 
Rwanda
Belgium